Neurophyseta ursmaralis is a moth in the family Crambidae. It was described by Schaus in 1927. It is found in Argentina and Paraguay.

References

Moths described in 1927
Musotiminae